The Iraqi Turkmens (also spelled as Turkoman and Turcoman), also referred to as Iraqi Turks, Turkish-Iraqis, the Turkish minority in Iraq, and the Iraqi-Turkish minority are Iraq's third largest ethnic group. 

Whilst Turkic migration to Iraq began in the 7th century, followed by 1055's Seljuk conquest, today most Turkmen are descendants of Ottoman soldiers, traders and civil servants who were brought into Iraq from Anatolia during Ottoman rule. Iraqi Turkmen share close ties with Turkish people and do not identify with the Turkmen of Turkmenistan and Central Asia.

Ethnonyms 

 

Prior to the mid-20th century the Turkmens in Iraq were known simply as "Turks". It was not until after the military coup of July 14, 1958, that the ruling military junta officially introduced the name "Turkman/Turkmen". According to the Iraqi Turkmen scholar Professor Suphi Saatçi:  

The state-imposed terms on the Turks of Iraq were not resisted, for the word "Turkmen" had historically been designated to the Oghuz Turks who had accepted Islam and migrated westwards from Central Asia to the Middle East, and had continued to be used in the region. Thus, the Iraqi Turkmen (as well as the Syrian Turkmens and Anatolian Turkmens) do not identify themselves with the Turkmen people of Turkmenistan. Rather, the term "Turkmen" in the Middle East is often used to designate Turkic-speakers, particularly in the Arab areas, or where Sunni Turks live in Shiite dominated areas.

Despite the modern usage of the term "Turkmen", Professor David Kushner has pointed out that the term "Turks" continues to be used in referring to the "Outside Turks" of the former Ottoman Empire, including the Turks in Iraq, which is in contrast to the terms used for other Turkic peoples who did not share this Ottoman history:

In literature 
Professor Orit Bashkin has observed that within Iraqi Turkmen literature, poets have managed to "remain loyal to Iraq as a state" whilst they have also "concurrently upheld their Turkish distinctiveness":

History 

The Iraqi Turkmens are the descendants of various waves of Turkic migration to Mesopotamia beginning from the 7th century until the end of Ottoman rule (1919). The first wave of migration dates back to the 7th century, followed by migrations during the Seljuk Empire (1037–1194), the fleeing Oghuz during the Mongol destruction of the Khwarazmian dynasty (see Kara Koyunlu and Ag Qoyunlu), and the largest migration, during the Ottoman Empire (1535–1919). With the conquest of Iraq by Suleiman the Magnificent in 1534, followed by Sultan Murad IV's capture of Baghdad in 1638, a large influx of Turks—predominantly from Anatolia—settled down in Iraq. Thus, most of today's Iraqi Turkmen are the descendants of the Ottoman soldiers, traders and civil servants who were brought into Iraq during the rule of the Ottoman Empire.

Migration under Arab rule 
The presence of Turkic peoples in what is today Iraq first began in the 7th century when approximately 2,000–5,000 Oghuz Turks were recruited in the Muslim armies of Ubayd-Allah ibn Ziyad. They arrived in 674 with the Umayyud conquest of Basra. More Turkic troops settled during the 8th century, from Bukhara to Basra and also Baghdad. During the subsequent Abbasid era, thousands more of Turkmen warriors were brought into Iraq; however, the number of Turkmen who had settled in Iraq were not significant, as a result, the first wave of Turkmen became assimilated into the local Arab population.

Seljuk migration 
The second wave of Turkmens to descend on Iraq were the Turks of the Great Seljuq Empire. Large scale migration of the Turkmen in Iraq occurred in 1055 with the invasion of Sultan Tuğrul Bey, the second ruler of the Seljuk dynasty, who intended to repair the holy road to Mecca. For the next 150 years, the Seljuk Turks placed large Turkmen communities along the most valuable routes of northern Iraq, especially Tal Afar, Erbil, Kirkuk, and Mandali, which is now identified by the modern community as Turkmeneli. Many of these settlers assumed positions of military and administrative responsibilities in the Seljuk Empire.

Ottoman migration 

The third, and largest, wave of Turkmen migration to Iraq arose during the four centuries of Ottoman rule (1535–1919). By the first half of the sixteenth century the Ottomans had begun their expansion into Iraq, waging wars against their arch rival, the Persian Safavids. In 1534, under the reign of Suleiman the Magnificent, Mosul was sufficiently secure within the Ottoman Empire and became the chief province (eyalet) responsible for all other administrative districts in the region. The Ottomans encouraged migration from Anatolia and the settlement of immigrant Turkmen along northern Iraq, religious scholars were also brought in to preach Hanafi (Sunni) Islam. With loyal Turkmen inhabiting the area, the Ottomans were able to maintain a safe route through to the southern provinces of Mesopotamia. Following the conquest, Kirkuk came firmly under Turkish control and was referred to as "Gökyurt", it is this period in history whereby modern Iraqi Turkmen claim association with Anatolia and the Turkish state.

With the conquest of Iraq by Suleiman the Magnificent in 1534, followed by Sultan Murad IV's capture of Baghdad in 1638, a large influx of Turks settled down in the region. After defeating the Safavids on December 31, 1534, Suleiman entered Baghdad and set about reconstructing the physical infrastructure in the province and ordered the construction of a dam in Karbala and major water projects in and around the city's countryside. Once the new governor was appointed, the town was to be composed of 1,000 foot soldiers and another 1,000 cavalry. However, war broke out after 89 years of peace and the city was besieged and finally conquered by Abbas the Great in 1624. The Persians ruled the city until 1638 when a massive Ottoman force, led by Sultan Murad IV, recaptured the city. In 1639, the Treaty of Zuhab was signed that gave the Ottomans control over Iraq and ended the military conflict between the two empires. Thus, more Turks arrived with the army of Sultan Murad IV in 1638 following the capture of Baghdad whilst others came even later with other notable Ottoman figures.

Post-Ottoman era 

Following the establishment of the Republic of Turkey in 1923, the Iraqi Turkmens wanted Turkey to annex the Mosul Vilayet and for them to become part of an expanded state; this is because, under the Ottoman monarchy, the Iraqi Turkmens enjoyed a relatively trouble-free existence as the administrative and business classes. However, due to the demise of the Ottoman monarchy, the Iraqi Turkmen participated in elections for the Constituent Assembly; the purpose of these elections was to formalise the 1922 treaty with the British government and obtain support for the drafting of a constitution and the passing of the 1923 Electoral law. The Iraqi Turkmens made their participation in the electoral process conditional that the preservation of the Turkish character in Kirkuk's administration and the recognition of Turkish as the liwa's official language. Although they were recognized as a constitutive entity of Iraq, alongside the Arabs and Kurds, in the constitution of 1925, the Iraqi Turkmen were later denied this status.

Since the demise of the Ottoman Empire, the Iraqi Turkmen have found themselves increasingly discriminated against from the policies of successive regimes, such as the Kirkuk Massacre of 1923, 1947, 1959 and in 1979 when the Ba'th Party discriminated against the community. Although they were recognized as a constitutive entity of Iraq (alongside the Arabs and Kurds) in the constitution of 1925, the Iraqi Turkmen were later denied this status.

Culture 
The Iraqi Turkmens are mostly Muslims and have close cultural and linguistic ties with the Anatolian region of Turkey.

Language 

The Iraqi Turkmen dialects fall under the Western Oghuz branch of Turkic languages and are often referred to as "Iraqi Turkmen Turkish" "Iraqi Turkish", and "Iraqi Turkic". The dialects possess their own unique characteristics, but have also been influenced by the historical standards of Ottoman Turkish (which was the official language of administration and lingua franca in Iraq between 1534 and 1920) and neighboring Azerbaijani Turkic. In particular, standard (i.e. Istanbul) Turkish as a prestige language has exerted a profound influence on their dialects; thus, the syntax in Iraqi Turkmen differs sharply from neighboring Irano-Turkic varieties. Collectively, the Iraqi Turkmen dialects also show similarities with Cypriot Turkish and Balkan Turkish regarding modality. The written language of the Iraqi Turkmen is based on Istanbul Turkish using the modern Turkish alphabet.

The Turkish language was recognized as a minority language in Kirkuk and Kifri in 1930, until the revolutionary government introduced the names "Turkman" and "Turkmanja" in 1959 with the aim of politically distancing the Turks of Iraq from Turkey. Then, in 1972, the Iraqi government banned the Turkish language and schools and media using Turkish were prohibited. Further bans on the Turkish language were made in the 1980s when the Baath regime prohibited the Iraqi Turkmens from speaking Turkish in public. It was not until 2005 that the Turkmen dialects were recognized under the Iraqi constitution; since then, the Iraqi Turkmens have opened numerous Turkish schools and media exposure from Turkey has led to the standardisation of their dialects towards Standard Turkish and the preferable language for adolescents associating with the Turkish culture.
 
Indeed, Iraqi Turkmens themselves (according to the 1957 census), as well as a range of linguistic sources, tend to view their language as a Turkish dialect (of Turkey), which they call Irak Türkmen Türkçesi, Irak Türkçesi, or Irak Türkmencesi. Studies have long noted the similarities between Iraqi Turkmen and certain Southeastern Anatolian dialects around the region of Urfa and Diyarbakır, or have described it as an "Anatolian" or an "Eastern Anatolian dialect". There are also linguists who have said that Iraqi Turkmen is closer to Azerbaijani, placing the Kirkuk dialect as "more or less" an "Azerbaijani Turkish" dialect. Yet, the Kirkuk dialect also shows comparable features with Urfa, and there are other regions in the Kirkuk Governorate, such as Altun Kupri, Taza Khurmatu, and Bashir, which are said to show unity with the Eastern Anatolian dialect of Urfa. Indeed, the dialects spoken in Turkmen-dominated regions in other parts of the country – including Amirli, Kifri, Tal Afar and Tuz Khurmatu – are all said to be similar to the Turkish dialect of Urfa. Hence, there are linguists who acknowledge similarities with Azerbaijani spoken in Iran but say that Iraqi Turkmen has "greater proximity to Turkish of Turkey". According to Christiane Bulut, Iraqi Turkman is neither Azeri nor Anatolian Turkish but "a transitional dialect group, displaying linguistic features similar to both".

Besides their traditional dialects, the Iraqi Turkmen diaspora also communicate in standard (Istanbul) Turkish, whilst the younger generations in Iraq (below the age of 18 in 2019) speak Istanbul Turkish with ease. In addition, diglossia in Iraq Turkmen dialects and Istanbul Turkish has become a widespread phenomenon. Most Iraqi Turkmen can also speak Arabic and/or Kurdish.

Dialects
Due to the existence of different Turkish migration waves to Iraq for over 1,200 years, the Iraqi Turkmen varieties are by no means homogeneous; dialects can vary according to regional features. Several prestige languages in the region have been particularly influential: Ottoman Turkish from 1534 onwards and then Persian after the Capture of Baghdad (1624). Once the Ottoman empire retook Iraq in 1640 the Turkish varieties of Iraq continued to be influenced by Ottoman Turkish, as well as other languages in the region, such as Arabic and Kurdish. Ottoman Turkish had a strong influence in Iraq until 1920, for it was not only the official language of administration but also the lingua franca. Indeed, Turkish has remained a prestige language among Iraqi Turkmen, exerting a profound historical influence on their dialect. As a result, Iraqi Turkmen syntax differs sharply from Irano-Turkic.

In general, the Iraqi Turkmen dialects of Tal Afar (approx 700,000 speakers), Altun Kupri, Tuz Khurmatu, Taza Khurmatu, Kifri, Bashir and Amirli show unity with the Eastern Anatolian dialect of Urfa; meanwhile, the dialects in Kirkuk, Erbil, Dohuk, Mandali and Khanaqin show similarities with Tehrani and Afshar Turkic dialects. Yet, the Kirkuk dialect also shows comparable features with Urfa, and 21.4% of Kirkuk province's population had self-declared their mother tongue as "Turkish" in the last census which asked about language. In particular, a cultural orientation towards Turkey prevails among Iraqi Turkmen intellectuals and diglossia (Turkish of Turkey) is very frequent in educated circles, especially in Kirkuk. In addition, the Erbil dialect shows similarities with Turkish dialects stretching from Kosovo to Rize, Erzurum and Malatya.

The Iraqi Turkmen generally also have an active command in standard Turkish due to their cultural orientation towards the Republic of Turkey. Turkish media outlets (especially satellite TV) has been influential; moreover, there are a number of private schools which teach in Turkish backed by Turkish institutions. Thus, diglossia in Iraq Turkmen and standard Turkish (of Turkey) has become a widespread phenomenon.

Politicization 
Professor Christiane Bulut has argued that publications from Azerbaijan often use expressions such as "Azerbaijani (dialects) of Iraq" or "South Azerbaijani" to describe Iraqi Turkmen dialects "with political implications"; however, in Turcological literature, closely related dialects in Turkey and Iraq are generally referred to as "eastern Anatolian" or "Iraq-Turkic/-Turkman" dialects, respectively.

Furthermore, the terms "Turkmen/Turkman" are also considered to be historically political because in the early 20th century the minority were simply recognized as Turks who spoke the Turkish language, until after the military coup of 14 July 1958, when the ruling military junta introduced the names "Turkman/Turkmen" to distance the Turks of Iraq from those in Anatolia, and then banned the Turkish language in 1972.

Official status 
Under the British Mandate over Iraq, the Turkish language was recognized as an official language in Kirkuk and Kifri under Article 5 of the Language Act of 1930. Article 6 of the Act permitted the language of education to be determined by the native language of the majority of students, whilst Article 2 and Article 4 gave Iraqi citizens the right to have court hearings and decisions verbally translated into Arabic, Kurdish, or Turkish in all cases.

Upon Iraq's entry into the League of Nations in 1932, the League demanded that Iraq recognize its ethnic and religious minorities. Consequently, the Turkish language, alongside Kurdish, was to be recognized as an official language under the Iraqi constitution of 1932: "in the liwa of Kirkuk, where a considerable part of the population is of Turkmen race, the official language, side by side with Arabic, shall be either Kurdish or Turkish". According to Article 1, no law, order, or act of government was allowed to contradict the terms of the 1932 constitution, nor could it be changed in the future.

However, in 1959 the military junta introduced the names "Turkman" and "Turkmanja". More recently, Article 4 of the 2005 Iraqi Constitution recognizes "Turkomen" as an official minority language in the "administrative units in which they constitute density of population" (alongside Syriac).

Adoption of the Turkish alphabet  
In 1997 the Iraqi Turkmen Congress adopted a Declaration of Principles, Article Three states that "the official written language of the Turkmen is Istanbul Turkish, and its alphabet is the new Latin alphabet." By 2005 the Turkish language replaced traditional Turkmeni, which had used the Arabic script, in Iraqi schools.

Education in Turkish 

In 2005 Iraqi Turkmen community leaders decided that the Turkish language would replace the use of traditional Turkmeni in Iraqi schools; Turkmeni had used the Arabic script whereas Turkish uses the Latin script (see Turkish alphabet). Kelsey Shanks has argued that "the move to Turkish can be seen as a means to strengthen the collective "we" identity by continuing to distinguish it from the other ethnic groups. ... The use of Turkish was presented as a natural progression from the Turkmen; any suggestion that the oral languages were different was immediately rejected."

Parental literacy rates in Turkish are low, as most are more familiar with the Arabic script (due to the Ba'athist regime). Therefore, the Turkmen Directorate of Education in Kirkuk has started Turkish language lessons for the wider society. Furthermore, the Turkmen officer for the Ministry of Education in Nineveh has requested from the "United Nations Assistance Mission for Iraq" the instigation of Turkish language classes for parents.

Media in Turkish 
The current prevalence of satellite television and media exposure from Turkey may have led to the standardisation of Turkmeni towards Turkish, and the preferable language for adolescents associating with the Turkish culture.

In 2004 the Türkmeneli TV channel was launched in Kirkuk, Iraq. It broadcasts programmes in the Turkish and Arabic languages. As of 2012, Türkmeneli TV has studios in Kirkuk and Baghdad in Iraq, and in the Çankaya neighbourhood in Ankara, Turkey. Türkmeneli TV has signed agreements with several Turkish channels, such as TRT, TGRT and ATV, as well as with the Turkish Republic of Northern Cyprus's main broadcaster BRT, to share programmes and documentaries.

Religion 
The Iraqi Turkmens are predominantly Muslims. The Sunni Turkmen form the majority (about 60–70%), but there is also a significant number of Turkmen practicing the Shia branch of Islam (about 30% to 40%). Nonetheless, the Turkmen are mainly secular, having internalized the secularist interpretation of state–religion affairs practiced in the Republic of Turkey since its foundation in 1923. Moreover, the fact that the Turkmen mainly live in urban areas, where they deal with trade and commerce, and their tendency to acquire higher education, the power of religious and tribal factors inherent in Iraq's political culture does not significantly affect the Turkmens. A small minority of the Iraqi Turkmens are Catholics, it is estimated their number at about 30,000.

Demographics

Population

Official statistics

The Iraqi Turkmens are the third largest ethnic group in Iraq. According to 2013 data from the Iraqi Ministry of Planning the Iraqi Turkmens have a population of about 3 million out of the total population of about 34.7 million (approximately 9% of the country's population).

Past censuses and controversies

According to Mesut Yeğen, documents from the British Foreign Office claim that the Turkmens made a majority in the city of Erbil in 1919 The 1957 Iraqi census (which is recognized as the last reliable census, as later censuses were reflections of the Arabization policies of the Ba'ath regime) recorded 567,000 Turks out of a total population of 6.3 million, forming 9% of the total Iraqi population. This put them third, behind Arabs and Kurds. However, due to the undemocratic environment, their number has always been underestimated and has long been a point of controversy. For example, in the 1957 census, the Iraqi government first claimed that there was 136,800 Turks in Iraq. However, the revised figure of 567,000 was issued after the 1958 revolution when the Iraqi government admitted that the Iraqi Turkmen population was actually more than 400% from the previous year's total. Scott Taylor has described the political nature of the results thusly:

Subsequent censuses, in 1967, 1977, 1987 and 1997, are all considered highly unreliable, due to suspicions of manipulation by the various regimes in Iraq. The 1997 census states that there was 600,000 Iraqi Turkmen out of a total population of 22,017,983, forming 2.72% of the total Iraqi population; however, this census only allowed its citizens to indicate belonging to one of two ethnicities, Arab or Kurd, this meant that many Iraqi Turkmen identified themselves as Arabs (the Kurds not being a desirable ethnic group in Saddam Hussein's Iraq), thereby skewing the true number of Iraqi Turkmen.

Other estimates
In 2004 Scott Taylor suggested that the Iraqi Turkmen population accounted for 2,080,000 of Iraq's 25 million inhabitants (forming 8.32% of the population) whilst Patrick Clawson has stated that the Iraqi Turkmen make up about 9% of the total population. Furthermore, international organizations such as the Unrepresented Nations and Peoples Organization has stated that the Iraqi Turkmen community is 3 million or 9–13% of the Iraqi population. Iraqi Turkmen claim that their total population is over 3 million. It is estimated to be 2.7% of total Iraqi population at 2015 by Gulf/2000 Project of Columbia University.

Areas of settlement 

The Iraqi Turkmen primarily inhabit northern Iraq,  in a region they refer to as "Turkmeneli" which stretches from the northwest to the east at the middle of Iraq. Iraqi Turkmen consider their capital city to be Kirkuk. Liam Anderson and Gareth Stansfield describe the Turkmeneli region as follows:

The Iraqi Turkmen generally consider several major cities, and small districts associated with these cities, as part of Turkmeneli. The major cities claimed to be a part of their homeland include: Altun Kupri, Badra, Bakuba, Diala, Erbil, Khanaqin, Kifri, Kirkuk, Kizilribat, Mendeli, Mosul, Salahaldeen, Sancar, Tal Afar, and Tuz Khurmatu. Thus, the Turkmeneli region lies between the Arab areas of settlement to the south and Kurdish areas to the north.

According to the 1957 census the Iraqi Turkmen formed the majority of inhabitants in the city of Kirkuk, with 40% declaring their mother tongue as "Turkish". The second-largest Iraqi Turkmen city is Tel Afar where they make up 95% of the inhabitants. The once mainly Turkoman cities of the Diyala Province such as Kifri have been heavily Kurdified and Arabized.

Some Iraqi Turkmen also live outside the Turkmeneli region. For example, there is a significant community living in Iraq's capital city of Baghdad.

Diaspora 
Most Iraqi Turkmens migrate to Turkey, followed by Germany, Denmark, and Sweden. There are also Iraqi Turkmen communities living in Canada, the United States, Australia, New Zealand, Greece, the Netherlands, and the United Kingdom.

According to Professor Suphi Saatçi, in 2010 approximately 1,000 Iraqi Turkmen were living in Canada, 2,000 in Denmark, and 4,000 in the Netherlands. Since the European migrant crisis (2014–19) the number of Iraqi Turkmen has continued to increase in Europe.

There are many established Iraqi Turkmen diaspora communities, such as the Canadian Iraqi Turkmen Culture Association, based in Canada.

Persecution 
The position of the Iraqi Turkmen has changed from being administrative and business classes of the Ottoman Empire to an increasingly discriminated against minority. Since the demise of the Ottoman Empire, the Iraqi Turkmen have been victims of several massacres, such as the Kirkuk Massacre of 1959. Furthermore, under the Ba'th party, discrimination against the Iraqi Turkmen increased, with several leaders being executed in 1979 as well as the Iraqi Turkmen community being victims of Arabization policies by the state, and Kurdification by Kurds seeking to push them forcibly out of their homeland. Thus, they have suffered from various degrees of suppression and assimilation that ranged from political persecution and exile to terror and ethnic cleansing. Despite being recognized in the 1925 constitution as a constitutive entity, the Iraqi Turkmen were later denied this status; hence, cultural rights were gradually taken away and activists were sent to exile.

Massacres

Massacre of 4 May 1924 
In 1924, the Iraqi Turkmens were seen as a disloyal remnant of the Ottoman Empire, with a natural tie to Mustafa Kemal Atatürk's new Turkish nationalist ideology emerging in the Republic of Turkey. The Iraqi Turkmen living in the region of Kirkuk were perceived as posing a threat to the stability of Iraq, particularly as they did not support the ascendancy of King Faisal I to the Iraqi throne. On May 4, these tensions boiled over into violence when soldiers from the Iraq Levies —a levied force raised by the British government after the First World War and consisting primarily of Assyrian — clashed with Turkmen in a Kirkuk market square after a dispute between an Assyrian soldier and a Turkmen shopkeeper. In the ensuing fracas, 200 Turkmen were killed by Assyrian soldiers.

Gavurbağı massacre of 1946 
Around 20 Iraqi Turkmen civilians were killed by Iraqi policemen including women and children on 12 July 1946 in Gavurbağı, Kirkuk.

Kirkuk massacre of 1959 
The Kirkuk massacre of 1959 came about due to the Iraqi government allowing the Iraqi Communist Party, which in Kirkuk was largely Kurdish, to target the Iraqi Turkmen. With the appointment of Maarouf Barzinji, a Kurd, as the mayor of Kirkuk in July 1959, tensions rose following the 14 July revolution celebrations, with animosity in the city polarizing rapidly between the Kurds and Iraqi Turkmen. On 14 July 1959, skirmishes broke out between the Iraqi Turkmen and Kurds, leaving some 20 Iraqi Turkmen dead. Furthermore, on 15 July 1959, Kurdish soldiers of the Fourth Brigade of the Iraqi army mortared Iraqi Turkmen residential areas, destroying 120 houses. Order was restored on 17 July by military units from Baghdad. The Iraqi government referred to the incident as a "massacre" and stated that between 31 and 79 Iraqi Turkmen were killed and some 130 injured.

Altun Kupri massacre of 1991

Over 135 Turkmen civilians were killed on 28 March 1991 during the Gulf War by Iraqi forces, in the Turkmen town of Altun Kupri.

Arabization 

In 1980, Saddam Hussein's government adopted a policy of assimilation of its minorities. Due to government relocation programs, thousands of Iraqi Turkmen were relocated from their traditional homelands in northern Iraq and replaced by Arabs, in an effort to Arabize the region. Furthermore, Iraqi Turkmen villages and towns were destroyed to make way for Arab migrants, who were promised free land and financial incentives. For example, the Ba'th regime recognised that the city of Kirkuk was historically an Iraqi Arab city and remained firmly in its cultural orientation. Thus, the first wave of Arabization saw Arab families move from the centre and south of Iraq into Kirkuk to work in the expanding oil industry. Although the Iraqi Turkmen were not actively forced out, new Arab quarters were established in the city and the overall demographic balance of the city changed as the Arab migrations continued.

Several presidential decrees and directives from state security and intelligence organizations indicate that the Iraqi Turkmen were a particular focus of attention during the assimilation process during the Ba'th regime. For example, the Iraqi Military Intelligence issued directive 1559 on 6 May 1980 ordering the deportation of Iraqi Turkmen officials from Kirkuk, issuing the following instructions: "identify the places where Turkmen officials are working in governmental offices [in order] to deport them to other governorates in order to disperse them and prevent them from concentrating in this governorate [Kirkuk]". In addition, on 30 October 1981, the Revolution's Command Council issued decree 1391, which authorized the deportation of Iraqi Turkmen from Kirkuk with paragraph 13 noting that "this directive is specially aimed at Turkmen and Kurdish officials and workers who are living in Kirkuk".

As primary victims of these Arabization policies, the Iraqi Turkmen suffered from land expropriation and job discrimination, and therefore would register themselves as "Arabs" in order to avoid discrimination. Thus, ethnic cleansing was an element of the Ba'thist policy aimed at reducing the influence of the Iraqi Turkmen in northern Iraq's Kirkuk. Those Iraqi Turkmen who remained in cities such as Kirkuk were subject to continued assimilation policies; school names, neighbourhoods, villages, streets, markets and even mosques with names of Turkic origin were changed to names that emanated from the Ba'th Party or from Arab heroes. Moreover, many Iraqi Turkmen villages and neighbourhoods in Kirkuk were simply demolished, particularly in the 1990s.

Turkmen–Kurdish tension and Kurdification 

The Kurds claimed de facto sovereignty over land that Iraqi Turkmen regard as theirs. For the Iraqi Turkmen, their identity is deeply inculcated as the rightful inheritors of the region as a legacy of the Ottoman Empire. Thus, it is claimed that the Kurdistan Region and Iraqi government has constituted a threat to the survival of the Iraqi Turkmen through strategies aimed at eradicating or assimilating them. The largest concentration of Iraqi Turkmen tended to be in Tal Afar. The formation of the Kurdistan Region in 1991 created high animosity between the Kurds and Iraqi Turkmen, resulting in some Iraqi Turkmen being victims of Kurdification, according to the Liam Anderson. The largest concentration of Iraqi Turkmen tended to be in the de facto capital of Erbil, a city which they had assumed prominent administrative and economic positions. Thus, they increasingly came into dispute and often conflict with the ruling powers of the city, which after 1996 was the Kurdistan Democratic Party of Massoud Barzani.

According to Anderson and Stansfield, in the 1990s, tension between the Kurds and Iraqi Turkmen inflamed as the KDP and the Patriotic Union of Kurdistan (PUK) were institutionalized as the political hegemons of the region and, from the perspective of the Iraqi Turkmen, sought to marginalize them from the positions of authority and to subsume their culture with an all-pervading Kurdistani identity. With the support of Ankara, a new political front of Turkmen parties, the Iraqi Turkmen Front (ITF), was formed on 24 April 1995. The relationship between the Iraqi Turkmen Front and the KDP was tense and deteriorated as the decade went on. Iraqi Turkmen associated with the Iraqi Turkmen Front complained about harassment by Kurdish security forces. In March 2000, the Human Rights Watch reported that the KDP's security attacked the offices of the ITF in Erbil, killing two guards, following a lengthy period of disputes between the two parties. In 2002, the KDP created an Iraqi Turkmen political organization, the Turkmen National Association, that supported the further institutionalization of the Kurdistan Region. This was viewed by pro-ITF Iraqi Turkmen as a deliberate attempt to "buy off" Iraqi Turkmen opposition and break their bonds with Ankara. Promoted by the KDP as the "true voice" of the Iraqi Turkmen, the Turkmen National Association has a pro-Kurdistani stance and has effectively weakened the ITF as the sole representative voice of the Iraqi Turkmen. Beginning in 2003, there were riots between Kurds and Turkmen in Kirkuk, a city that Turkmen view as historically theirs. According to United Nations reports, the KRG and Peshmerga were "illegaily policing Kirkurk, abducting Turkmen and Arabs and subjecting them to torture". Between 2003 and 2006, 1,350 Turkmens in Tal A'far died mainly from sectarian violence and war and thousands of houses were damaged or demolished, resulting in 4,685 displaced families.

Politics 

Between ten and twelve Turkmen individuals were elected to the transitional National Assembly of Iraq in January 2005, including five on the United Iraqi Alliance list, three from the Iraqi Turkmen Front (ITF), and either two or four from the Democratic Patriotic Alliance of Kurdistan.

In the December 2005 elections, between five and seven Turkmen candidates were elected to the Council of Representatives. This included one candidate from the ITF (its leader Saadeddin Arkej), two or four from the United Iraqi Alliance, one from the Iraqi Accord Front and one from the Kurdistani Alliance.

Iraqi Turkmen have also emerged as a key political force in the controversy over the future status of northern Iraq and the Kurdistan Region. The government of Turkey has helped fund such political organizations as the Iraqi Turkmen Front, which opposes Iraqi federalism and in particular the proposed annexation of Kirkuk to the Kurdistan Regional Government.

Tensions between the two groups over Kirkuk, however, have slowly died out and on January 30, 2006, the President of Iraq, Jalal Talabani, said that the "Kurds are working on a plan to give Iraqi Turkmens autonomy in areas where they are a majority in the new constitution they're drafting for the Kurdistan Region of Iraq." However, it never happened and the policies of Kurdification by KDP and PUK after 2003 (with non-Kurds being pressed to move) have prompted serious inter-ethnic problems.

Notable people 
 Farah Zeynep Abdullah, Turkish actress
 Jafar al-Askari, former Prime Minister of Iraq (1923–24 and 1926–27)
 Abbas al-Bayati, politician
 Mohammed Mahdi al-Bayati, Iraqi politician
 Yasin al-Hashimi, former Prime Minister of Iraq (1924–25 and 1935–36)
Khairi Al-Hindawi, poet 
 Maruf al Rusafi, poet
 Nuri al-Said, former Prime Minister of Iraq (1930–32, 1938–40, 1941–44, 1946–47, 1949, 1950–52, 1954–57 and 1958)
 Arshad al-Salihi, politician
 Mohammed Abdullah al-Shahwani, Iraqi general
 Jamil Sidqi al-Zahawi, Iraqi poet
 Saadeddin Arkej, politician
 Selim Bayraktar, Turkish actor
Ahmet bin Carlak, considered the first environmentalist in Turkey and called the "Tarzan of Manisa"
 Kamil Chadirji, Iraqi politician 
 Rifat Chadirji, Iraqi architect 
 David Chokachi, American actor 
 Hijri Dede, poet
 İhsan Doğramacı, founder of Bilkent University and Hacettepe University
 Sinan Erbil singer
 Esad Erbili, Sufi sheikh
 Fuzûlî, 16th century poet, writer and thinker
 Gökböri, leading emir and general
 Amine Gülşe, Swedish model; crowned Miss Turkey (2014) and actress
 Muhammad Sadiq Hassan, Iraqi poet
 İsmet Hürmüzlü, Turkish actor
 Jasim Mohammed Jaafar, Minister for Youth & Sports
 Gökhan Kırdar, Turkish musician
 Lütfi Kırdar, Turkish politician
 Nemir Kirdar, billionaire businessman
 Fathi Safwat Kirdar, Iraqi painter and sculptor
 Rena Kirdar, author and socialite
 Üner Kırdar, Turkish diplomat and senior United Nations official
, Minister of State in Iraq (2020–present)
 Hidir Lutfi, poet 
 Younis Mahmoud, football player
 , winner of Miss Germany (1996)
 Reha Muhtar, Turkish television personality
 Talib Mushtaq, poet and diplomat
 Salih Neftçi, Turkish economist
 Rashad Mandan Omar, Minister of Science and Technology (2003)
 Hasan Rıza Pasha, Ottoman general
 Fahmi Said, army officer 
 Amel Senan, actress 
 Hikmat Sulayman, former Prime Minister of Iraq (1936–37)
 Mehmet Türkmehmet, football player
 Ali Saip Ursavaş, Turkish politician
, American actor
Imad al-Din Zengi, ruler of the Zengid dynasty
Gökhan Kırdar, musician

See also
 Turkmeneli
 Turkish minorities in the former Ottoman Empire
 Turks in the Arab world
 Syrian Turkmen
 Turks in Lebanon
 Demographics of Iraq
 Minorities in Iraq
 Human rights in post-invasion Iraq
 Iraqi Turkmen Front
 2009 Taza bombing
 16th Turkmen Brigade
 Iraq–Turkey relations

References

Bibliography
 
 

 

 

 
 

.

 

.

External links
 

Ethnic groups in Iraq
Demographics of Iraq
Iraqi Turkmens
Muslim communities in Asia
Ethnic groups in the Middle East
Indigenous peoples of Western Asia
Ethnic groups in the Arab world